Bradly Buetow (born October 28, 1950) is a retired ice hockey player and coach.  In college, he played for the Minnesota Golden Gophers.  He played 25 regular season games in the World Hockey Association for the Cleveland Crusaders and 37 games for the Jacksonville Barons of the American Hockey League in 1973–74.  Following his playing career, Buetow was head coach at Minnesota, US International University, Colorado College, the Quad City Mallards, and the Waco Wizards.

Career
Brad Buetow began attending the University of Minnesota in the fall of 1969 and started playing under head coach Glen Sonmor the following year. Buetow's playing career coincided with an unstable period in the program's history as Sonmor left in the middle of Buetow's Junior year and was replaced by Ken Yackel who lasted only the remainder of the season in his position before being succeeded by Herb Brooks. Buetow tried to put the upheaval of his time at Minnesota behind him with a professional career when he signed on to play for the Cleveland Crusaders of the WHA, but he went scoreless in 25 games before finishing out the season with the AHL's Jacksonville Barons and hung up his skates when the season finished.

The next season Buetow returned to the Twin Cities to serve as an assistant under Herb Brooks  who had taken the Golden Gophers to the first National title the year before. Under Brooks Buetow was part of two more national champion teams. When Brooks accepted the position of head coach/GM for Team USA at the 1980 Winter Olympics, Buetow stepped in as interim coach for the 1979-80 season. When his old boss opted not to return, Minnesota removed the interim tag from his title. Buetow was incredibly successful in Minnesota, providing three 30-win seasons and four NCAA tournament berths in six seasons, including two WCHA regular-season titles, two WCHA tournament titles and two Final Fours. His best team was the 1980-81 unit, which swept the WCHA regular season and tournament titles and advanced all the way to the 1981 national title game. However, Gopher fans had gotten used to winning national titles, and when Buetow was unable to deliver one, he was fired by his alma mater after the 1984–85 season.

Buetow moved west to take over at U.S. International which was set to begin play in the newly formed Great West Hockey Conference the next season. The Gulls won the first conference title, going 9-3 against the competition, but immediately the conference was in trouble when Northern Arizona dropped their program at the end of the year. U.S. International managed to hold on for the next two seasons but after 1987–88 both the conference and the school's Division I hockey program ceased to exist and Buetow was out of a job.

Fortunately a position at Colorado College opened up and Buetow stepped in to take over for Mike Bertsch. As with many coaches in CC's recent past Buetow had a difficult time getting the team to win games but managed to get the team its first non-losing season in over a decade in 1991–92 and received the WCHA Coach of the Year for his efforts, but he was forced to resignafter the following season when an NCAA investigation revealed that Buetow had committed recruiting violations. While Buetow would continue to coach he would never again have a chance at an NCAA school.

Career statistics

Head coaching record

References

External links

The Complete World Hockey Association, 9e by Scott Surgent, Xaler Press, 

1950 births
Living people
American ice hockey coaches
American men's ice hockey right wingers
Cleveland Crusaders players
Colorado College Tigers men's ice hockey coaches
Ice hockey coaches from Minnesota
Sportspeople from Saint Paul, Minnesota
Jacksonville Barons players
Minnesota Golden Gophers men's ice hockey coaches
Minnesota Golden Gophers men's ice hockey players
United States International Gulls men's ice hockey coaches
Ice hockey people from Saint Paul, Minnesota